Chikkiku Chikkikkichu  is a 2015 Indian Tamil-language romantic comedy film directed by N Rajesh Kumar and starring Mithun and Mrudula Murali. The film takes place on a train from Chennai to Nagercoil.

Cast 
Mithun as Chikki a.k.a. Chidambara Krishnan
Mrudula Murali as Varsha
Aadhavan as Venky
Anup Arvind

Soundtrack 
The music by Vijay Benjamin features a song sung by T. Rajender.

Reception 
Malini Mannath of The New Indian Express opined that "But at times it does look like the debutant maker had attempted to stretch what should have been a short film, to an unmanageable length". Anupama Subramanian of Deccan Chronicle wrote that "The director should be commended for steer clearing from sleazy scenes despite the film being a romantic tale that takes place in one night journey. The problem with the movie is that it just revolves around the lead two characters most part of it".

References

External links